All Your Faded Things is an album released by Anna Oxygen on July 22, 2003 under the Cold Crush Records label. It was produced by Justin Trosper.

Critical reception
Wrote MacKenzie Wilson of Allmusic in a review for the album, Oxygen is "enjoyably cheeky in delivering her own dance-pop formula." Calling the album synthpop, the review also praised the "minimalist approach" of the production, which led to a "fluid, full sound well-suited for both dance and indie rock fans." Also, "she adds a bit of sauce to the new-millennium electroclash stage and celebrates the delicious design of classic new wave."

Track listing
"Baby Blue" – 2:49
"Red Horse Cafe" – 2:56
"Psychedelic Dance Party" – 1:49
"Aviva" – 2:01
"Scientist" – 2:22
"Mine All Mine" – 1:32
"Loose to the Tight" – 2:15
"Spectacle" – 2:50
"Nerve Angels Two" – 2:15
"Primary Colors" – 1:32
"Painted Yellow Crown" – 2:19
"Man on the Screen" – 2:10
"Nerve Angels Three" – 1:49
"Ponytails" – 3:17

References

Personnel

Anna Oxygen - primary artist
Justin Trosper - engineer and production

External links
All Your Faded Things at Discogs

2003 albums
Anna Oxygen albums